The following is a list of notable deaths in October 1990.

Entries for each day are listed alphabetically by surname. A typical entry lists information in the following sequence:
 Name, age, country of citizenship at birth, subsequent country of citizenship (if applicable), reason for notability, cause of death (if known), and reference.

October 1990

1
John Stewart Bell, 62, Northern Irish physicist, cerebral hemorrhage.
Edmund George Irving, 80, British hydrographer.
Andrzej Krzanowski, 39, Polish composer.
Augustin Laurent, 94, French politician.
Curtis LeMay, 83, American general, heart attack.
Russell Thacher, 71, American film producer (Soylent Green), complications from surgery.
Tommy Thompson, 63, American football player, cancer.

2
Peter Herman Adler, 90, Austrian-born American conductor.
Xosé María Díaz Castro, 76, Galician poet and translator.
John Groff, 100, American general, heart attack.
Loni Nest, 75, German actress.
Isolina Rondón, 77, Puerto Rican nationalist.
Fred Rwigyema, 33, Rwandan soldier, shot.
Heinie Schuble, 83, American baseball player.
Mercedes Simone, 86, Argentinian singer and actress.
Norbert Vesak, 53, Canadian choreographer, brain aneurysm.

3
Winslow Ames, 83, American art historian, heart attack.
Amy Bailey, 94, Jamaican civil rights activist.
Charlotte Boyle, 91, American swimmer.
Stefano Casiraghi, 30, Italian powerboat racer, boating accident.
Res Jost, 72, Swiss theoretical physicist.
Eleanor Steber, 76, American opera singer, complications from heart surgery.

4
Alyn Ainsworth, 66, British musician.
Jill Bennett, 58, English actress, drug overdose.
Avis Bunnage, 67, English actress.
Erwin Bünning, 84, German biologist, Alzheimer's disease.
Luciano Catenacci, 57, Italian actor.
Roy Charman, 60, English sound engineer.
Jacques de Mahieu, 74, French-Argentine anthropologist and peronist.
Vance Dinges, 75, American baseball player.
Sergey Lapin, 78, Soviet diplomat.
František Nekolný, 82, Czechoslovak boxer.
Waldemar Philippi, 61, German footballer.
Ray Stephens, 35, American singer (Village People) and actor (The Great Space Coaster), AIDS.
Peter Taylor, 62, English football player, lung disease.

5
Félix Dafauce, 93, Spanish actor.
André Grabar, 94, Ukrainian-American art historian.
Dixie Howell, 70, American baseball player.
Yoshio Kondo, 80, American Biologist and malacologist.
J. Murray Mitchell, 62, American climatologist.
Sam Taylor, 74, American saxophonist.
Ramkumar Verma, 85, Hindi poet.
Đorđe Vujadinović, 80, Yugoslav football player.
Jan Hendrik Waszink, 81, Dutch Latin scholar.

6
Märta Dorff, 81, Swedish film actress.
Asser Fagerström, 78, Finnish pianist, composer and actor.
James E. Newcom, 85, American film editor.
Danny Rodriguez, 22, American Christian rapper, shot.
Richard P. Ross Jr., 84, American general.
Henryk Vogelfanger, 86, Polish actor.
Bahriye Üçok, 70-71, Turkish politician and journalist, assassinated.

7
Chiara Badano, 18, Italian Catholic activist, osteosarcoma, bone cancer.
Bellarmino Bagatti, 84, Italian archaeologist.
Darrel Brown, 67, American basketball player.
Beatrice Hutton, 97, Australian architect.
Rashid bin Saeed Al Maktoum, 78, Emirati politician, prime minister (since 1979).
Scott M. Matheson, 61, American politician, governor of Utah (1977–1985), multiple myeloma.
Grim Natwick, 100, American animator (Fleischer Studios), pneumonia.
Manuel Ramos Otero, 42, Puerto Rican writer, AIDS.

8
Juan José Arévalo, 86, Guatemalan politician, president (1945–1951).
Frank Cope, 74, American football player.
William Henry Harrison III, 94, American politician, member of the U.S. House of Representatives (1951–1955, 1961–1965, 1967–1969), heart failure.
William James Jameson, 92, American judge.
Jimmy Mills, 96, Scottish-American footballer.
Robert F. Murphy, 66, American anthropologist, heart failure.
Kamalapati Tripathi, 85, Indian politician.
Eric Wennström, 81, Swedish hurdler.
B.J. Wilson, 43, English drummer, pneumonia.

9
Mildred Bayer, 81, American humanitarian.
Murray Bowen, 77, American psychologist.
John Brooks, 80, American Olympic long jumper (1936).
Georges de Rham, 87, Swiss mathematician.
Dessie Grew, 37, Irish Provisional IRA volunteer, shot.
Markku Hakulinen, 34, Finnish ice hockey player, suicide by train collision.
Martin McCaughey, 23, Irish Provisional IRA volunteer, shot.
Richard Murdoch, 83, English actor.
Arnold Olsen, 73, American politician, member of the U.S. House of Representatives (1961–1971).
Géza Ottlik, 78, Hungarian writer and mathematician.
Boris Paichadze, 75, Soviet footballer.
Lars Thörn, 86, Swedish sailor.

10
Kenneth Cross (physiologist), 74, British physiologist.
Emil Josef Diemer, 82, German chess player.
Walter Hammersen, 79, German politician.
Dick Jorgensen, 56, American football official, cancer.
Irene Mayer Selznick, 83, American theatrical producer, breast cancer.
Jerónimo Mihura, 88, Spanish film director.
Wally Moses, 80, American baseball player.
Tom Murton, 62, American prison warden, cancer.
Floyd R. Newman, 99, American oil businessman.
Barbara Boggs Sigmund, 51, American politician, cancer.
Edward Szostak, 79, Polish basketball player.
Carlos Thompson, 67, Argentine actor, suicide by gunshot.
Josef Trousílek, 72, Czechoslovak ice hockey player.

11
Ichio Asukata, 75, Japanese politician.
Anatole Broyard, 70, American writer and journalist, prostate cancer.
George Corbett, 82, American football player.
Günter Kuhnke, 78, German submarine commander.
Ken Spain, 44, American basketball player, cancer.
Robert Tessier, 56, American actor, cancer.
Adri van Male, 80, Dutch footballer.

12
Rifaat el-Mahgoub, 64, Egyptian politician, shot.
Leonard Krieger, 72, American historian.
Leif Larsen, 84, Norwegian sailor.
Rahman Morina, 47, Yugoslav politician, heart attack.
John O'Brien, 65, New Zealand politician.
Frederick Rossini, 91, American thermodynamicist.
Bridget Bate Tichenor, 72, British surrealist painter and fashion editor.
Peter Wessel Zapffe, 90, Norwegian philosopher.

13
Lino Donoso, 68, Cuban baseball player.
Douglas Edwards, 73, American newscaster, bladder cancer.
Hans Freudenthal, 85, German-born Dutch mathematician.
Hans Namuth, 75, German-American photographer, traffic collision.
Le Duc Tho, 78, Vietnamese politician and diplomat, Nobel Prize recipient (1973), cancer.
Lewis Veraldi, 60, American automotive engineer, heart attack.

14
Leonard Bernstein, 72, American conductor and composer (West Side Story), pneumonia.
Tom Brigance, 77, American fashion designer.
Leon Brown, 71, American basketball player.
Daniel Guilet, 91, French-American violinist, cerebral hemorrhage.
Irina Odoyevtseva, 95, Russian poet, novelist and memoirist.
Clifton Pugh, 65, Australian artist, heart attack.
Carin Swensson, 85, Swedish actress.

15
Tibor Berczelly, 78, Hungarian Olympic fencer (1936, 1948, 1952).
Helen Bray, 100, American silent film actress.
Sam Dolgoff, 88, Russian-American anarchist.
Wilhelm Magnus, 83, German-American mathematician.
David McCalden, 39, British-American far-right activist, AIDS.
William Edwin Minshall, Jr., 78, American politician, member of the U.S. House of Representatives (1955–1974).
Gwen Nelson, 89, English actress.
Yu Pingbo, 90, Chinese literary critic.
Boris Piotrovsky, 82, Soviet archaeologist.
Delphine Seyrig, 58, French actress, ovarian cancer.
Om Shivpuri, 52, Indian actor, heart attack.
Vital Van Landeghem, 77, Belgian football player.

16
Art Blakey, 71, American drummer, lung cancer.
Jorge Bolet, 75, Cuban-American pianist, AIDS-related complications.
Douglas Campbell, 94, American flying ace during World War I.
Dorothy M. Healy, 76, American historian.
Berl Huffman, 83, American sports coach.
Carl Just, 93, Norwegian journalist.
Blake Pelly, 83, Australian politician and businessman.
Roger Powell, 94, English bookbinder.
Giovanni Varglien, 79, Italian footballer.
Alexander Zakin, 87, Russian-American pianist, heart failure.

17
Ralph Bowman, 79, Canadian ice hockey player.
Denis Cordner, 66, Australian footballer.
Harry Fletcher, 80, Australian politician.
Seth Morgan, 41, American novelist, traffic collision.
Jordan Olivar, 75, American football player, cancer.
Tadashige Ono, 81, Japanese artist.
Paul Seabury, 67, American political scientist, kidney failure.

18
Michael Bigg, 50, English-Canadian marine biologist, leukemia.
Marie-France Dufour, 41, French singer, leukemia.
Nick Etten, 77, American baseball player.
Pyotr Fedoseyev, 82, Soviet philosopher.
Sol Furth, 83, American Olympic jumper (1932).
Sir Ben Lockspeiser, 99, British scientific administrator (CERN).
Harry Marker, 91, American film editor.
Heinz Oskar Vetter, 72, German politician.

19
Jerry Cronin, 65, Irish politician, Parkinson's disease.
Haim Gvati, 89, Zionist activist and Israeli politician.
René Highway, 35, Canadian dancer, AIDS.
Augusto Tiezzi, 80, Italian cinematographer.
Samuel Wilbert Tucker, 77, American lawyer.
Lew Worsham, 73, American golfer.

20
Colette Audry, 84, French writer.
Américo Hoss, 74, Hungarian-Argentine cinematographer.
Freda Jackson, 82, English actress.
Alma Theodora Lee, 78, Australian botanist and plant taxonomist.
Joel McCrea, 84, American actor, pneumonia.
Kona Prabhakara Rao, 74, Indian politician, cardiopulmonary failure.

21
Karl Egil Aubert, 66, Norwegian mathematician.
Tom Carvel, 84, Greek-American businessman.
Dany Chamoun, 56, Lebanese politician, murdered.
Eugen Haugland, 78, Norwegian triple jumper and Olympian.
Jo Ann Kelly, 46, English musician, brain cancer.
Lotar Olias, 76, German composer.
Brij Sadanah, 57, Indian filmmaker, suicide by gunshot.
Prabhat Rainjan Sarkar, 69, Indian composer and guru, heart attack.
Athol Shmith, 76, Australian photographer.
Ruth Stockton, 74, American politician.
Frank Waddey, 85, American baseball player.

22
Louis Althusser, 72, French philosopher, heart attack.
Kamil Lhoták, 78, Czechoslovak artist.
Nikolay Rybnikov, 59, Soviet and Russian film actor, heart attack.
Frank Sinkwich, 70, American football player.

23
Norman Buchan, 67, British politician.
P. K. Kelkar, 81, Indian scientist.
Berthold Lubetkin, 88, Georgian-British architect.
Zephania Mothopeng, 77, South African political activist, lung cancer.
Dave Murray, 37, Canadian skier and Olympian, skin cancer.
Thomas Williams, 63, American novelist, lung cancer.

24
André Aumerle, 83, French cyclist.
Jim Clark, 63, American baseball player.
Boris Maluev, 61, Soviet and Russian painter.
John Sex, 34, American singer, AIDS.
Richard Tyler, 62, American sound engineer.

25
Ed Bagdon, 64, American football player.
Major Holley, 66, American bassist, heart attack.
Zara Mints, 63, Soviet literary scientist.
Bennie Oosterbaan, 84, American football player.
Alberto da Costa Pereira, 60, Portuguese footballer.
Ikey Robinson, 86, American banjoist.
Williamson A. Sangma, 71, Indian politician.

26
Lawrence Andreasen, 44, American diver, accidental fall.
Robert Antelme, 73, French writer.
Joan Brown, 52, American painter, blunt force trauma, accident.
Arne Dagfin Dahl, 96, Norwegian soldier.
Guillermo Garcia Gonzales, 36, Cuban chess Grandmaster, traffic collision.
Breandán Ó hEithir, 60, Irish writer and broadcaster.
Ödön Lendvay, 47, Hungarian basketball player.
William S. Paley, 89, American television executive, kidney failure.
Johnny Sanders, 68, American football executive, heart failure.
Harry Wilson, 88, American multi-athlete.

27
Chet Adams, 75, American football player.
Rafael Banquells, 73, Cuban-Mexican actor, director and TV producer.
Xavier Cugat, 90, Spanish musician, heart failure.
Jacques Demy, 59, French film director and lyricist, AIDS.
Princess Sophie of Hohenberg, 89, Austrian noble, daughter of Archduke Franz Ferdinand of Austria.
Wacław Kowalski, 74, Polish actor.
Elliott Roosevelt, 80, American general and politician, son of Franklin D. Roosevelt, heart failure.
Ugo Tognazzi, 68, Italian actor and filmmaker, cerebral hemorrhage.
Béla Volentik, 82, Hungarian football player.

28
Aleksandra Chudina, 66, Soviet athlete, stomach cancer.
Ernst Rudolf Huber, 87, German jurist.
Kolau Nadiradze, 95, Soviet poet.
Geminio Ognio, 72, Italian Olympic water polo player (1948, 1952).
Robert Jan Verbelen, 79, Belgian nazi collaborator during World War II.

29
Aleksei Alelyukhin, 70, Soviet flying ace during World War II.
Joseph Attles, 87, American actor.
Herbert Brodkin, 77, American producer and director of film and television.
Emrys Roberts, 80, Welsh politician.
William French Smith, 73, American lawyer, attorney general (1981–1985), cancer.
Juha Vainio, 52, Finnish musician, heart attack.
Volker von Collande, 76, German actor and filmmaker.

30
Wim Gijsen, 57, Dutch author.
Willy Jürissen, 78, German football player.
Harry Lauter, 76, American actor, heart attack.
Vinod Mehra, 45, Indian actor, heart attack.
Craig Russell, 42, Canadian drag queen and actor, AIDS.
Alfred Sauvy, 92, French demographer.
V. Shantaram, 88, Indian actor and filmmaker.
Tom Steele, 81, American stuntman.
Piroska Szekrényessy, 74, Hungarian pair skater and Olympian.
Kwok Tak-Seng, 79, Hong Kong businessman, heart attack.
Germaine Van Dievoet, 91, Belgian swimmer.

31
Carl Belew, 59, American country musician, cancer.
Harold Caccia, Baron Caccia, 84, British diplomat.
Jim Foster, 55, American LGBT activist, AIDS.
Aya Kōda, 86, Japanese novelist, heart attack.
Hugh McPhillips, 70, American actor and television director, traffic collision.
Roger Price, 72, American humorist and author.
M. L. Vasanthakumari, 62, Indian singer, cancer.

References 

1990-10
 10